Nobuko Nabeshima (15 July 1886 – 8 May 1969) (In Japanese 松平信子, or まつだいら のぶこ), later known as Madame Matsudaira, was a Japanese socialite. As wife of a Japanese ambassador based in Washington and London, she was well known as a political hostess in the West in the 1920s and 1930s.

Early life 
Nabeshima was born in 1886, the daughter of politician and college president Nabeshima Naohiro and Nabeshima Nagako, who was president of the Oriental Women's Association (東洋婦人会). She was a member of the powerful Nabeshima family. Nabeshima attended the Gakushuin Women's School, and was later president of the school's alumnae association.

Career 
Nabeshima was an aide and translator to Empress Teimei, whose son later married Nabeshima's daughter. She lived in Washington, D.C. as a political hostess, and traveled with her daughters from 1925 to 1928, while her husband was the Japanese Ambassador to the United States. She gave a public speech of gratitude in Boston in 1927. Her gowns were described in newspaper accounts of state dinners and other events. The family lived in London in 1909 (when daughter Setsuko was born) and from 1929 to 1935, when her husband was the Japanese Ambassador to the Court of St. James. She welcomed and promoted an international touring display of Japanese ceremonial dolls.

Madame Matsudaira wrote poetry. She assisted American writer Elizabeth Gray Vining, who described her as "grey-haired, serene, humorous, and wise." She was mentioned in two of Eleanor Roosevelt's "My Day" columns in May 1953, when Roosevelt was traveling in Japan.

Personal life 
In 1906, Nabeshima married diplomat Tsuneo Matsudaira. Their son was Ichiro Matsudaira. One of their daughters was Setsuko, who became a princess in the Imperial House of Japan.  One of the Matsudairas' grandchildren is Tsunenari Tokugawa, current head of the Tokugawa clan (as of 2022), and one of their great-grandchildren is writer and translator Iehiro Tokugawa. Her husband died in 1949, and she lived with her widowed daughter after 1953; she died in 1969, at the age of 82.

References

External links 

 Nobu Matsudaira as a sitter in four portraits made in 1922 by Bassano Ltd, in the National Portrait Gallery (UK)
 A newsreel collection that includes a shot of Madame Matsudaira at a fashion event in 1926, at Internet Archive

1886 births
1969 deaths
Japanese women